The Leeuwenhoek Medal, established in 1875 by the Royal Netherlands Academy of Arts and Sciences (KNAW), in honor of the 17th- and 18th-century microscopist Antoni van Leeuwenhoek, is granted every ten years to the scientist judged to have made the most significant contribution to microbiology during the preceding decade. Starting in 2015, the Royal Dutch Society for Microbiology (KNVM) began awarding the Leeuwenhoek Medal, selecting Jillian Banfield, the first woman to receive the award in 2023.

Recipients
Source: KNVM
1877 Christian Gottfried Ehrenberg, Germany
1885 Ferdinand Cohn, Germany
1895 Louis Pasteur, France
1905 Martinus Beijerinck, Netherlands
1915 Sir David Bruce, United Kingdom
1925 Félix d'Herelle, (at the time) Egypt
1935 Sergei Nikolaevitch Winogradsky, France
1950 Selman Abraham Waksman, United States
1960 André Lwoff, France
1970 Cornelius Bernardus van Niel (Kees van Niel), United States
1981 Roger Yate Stanier, France
1992 Carl Woese, United  States
2003 Karl Stetter, Germany
2015 Craig Venter, United States of America
2023 Jillian Banfield, Australia

See also 
 Royal Society Leeuwenhoek Lecture
 List of biology awards

References

Biology awards
Dutch honorary society awards
Dutch science and technology awards
 
Microbiology
1877 establishments in the Netherlands
Antonie van Leeuwenhoek
Awards established in 1877